Casola di Napoli is a comune (municipality) in the  Metropolitan City of Naples in the Italian region Campania, located about  southeast of Naples.

Casola di Napoli borders the  municipalities of Gragnano and Lettere.

References

Cities and towns in Campania